Ramnagar is a town and notified area committee in Udhampur District in the Indian union territory of Jammu and Kashmir.

Ramnagar Town 
Ramanagar is a historical small town situated in Udhampur District of Jammu and Kashmir. Ramnagar is named after its last ruler, King Ram Singh of Ramanagar. The King' Palace is also in the town. It has been taken over by Archeological Survey of India for maintenance and preservation.
Inside the palace there is one sheesh mahal or a kind of hall where we can still see the painting of different types some are of the queens.
Ramnagar is mostly a hilly area. Seoz glaciers and Samna Banj hills are some of the very high altitude areas.
Main attractions of Ramnagar are:
 Pingla Mata Shrine
 Ramnagar Palace
 Ramnagar fort
 Chountra mata Shrine
 Devi bani Manawal
 Narsingh mandir Ramnagar
 Seoz glaciers and adjacent glaciers
 Dudu Basantgarh (hill station)
 Raja Ram Singh Glass Palace  ( Sheesh Mehal )
 Akshardham Cave
 
Ramnagar sits on the Mansa Devi Nallah, a tributary of the Tawi River that flows through Jammu. It is 27 km off the Udampur-Dhar-Pathankot road. The 19th-century palace, Rani's Samadhi (mausoleum) and the impressive fortress are all under the care of the ASI. It is also the place with highest rainfall in Jammu and Kashmir

History

Ramnagar town was once the capital of the Bandralta State whose last king, Bhupendra Dev of Bandral Rajput Dynasty, was ousted in 1821 by Sikh forces and retired into obscurity near Ambala in today's Haryana state. Ramnagar's 19th-century palace complex consisting of three sections was built by Rajput Raja Suchet Singh (ruled 1822 to 1844), brother of Jammu Raja Gulab Singh - a prominent Dogra warrior in the campaign to oust Bhupendra Dev, and by Ram Singh, son of Rajah Ranbir Singh

Geography of Ramnagar Tehsil
It has an average elevation of 828 metres (2716 feet). Ramnagar is hilly and roughly 90% forested aleit with scrubby, secondary growth in many parts. Local attractions include the pilgrimage sites of Chountra Mata to each of which a Akhand Jyoti is carried on the eve of Navratra (which is scheduled twice a year). This yatra (pilgrimage) is carried with great fervour and dedication towards Maa Durga and Maa Kali. These pilgrimages are traditionally performed on foot though a motorable road is now under construction to Chontra Mata.

Other points of interest include Marhada Mata, Gurlang, Seoz Glaciers, the Samna Manj range, and the Shri Narsing Ji Maharaj temple in central Ramnagar.

Demographics
Ramnagar is a Municipal Committee city in district of Udhampur, Jammu and Kashmir. The Ramnagar city is divided into 13 wards for which elections are held every five years. The Ramnagar Municipal Committee has population of 6,292 of which 3,237 are males while 3,055 are females as per report released by Census of India 2011.

Population of Children with age of 0-6 is 748 which is 11.89% of total population of Ram Nagar (MC). In Ram Nagar Municipal Committee, Female Sex Ratio is of 944 against state average of 889. Moreover, Child Sex Ratio in Ram Nagar is around 894 compared to Jammu and Kashmir state average of 862. Literacy rate of Ram Nagar city is 81.64% higher than state average of 67.16%. In Ram Nagar, Male literacy is around 87.33% while female literacy rate is 75.65%.

Ramnagar Municipal Committee has total administration over 1,330 houses to which it supplies basic amenities like water and sewerage. It is also authorized to build roads within Municipal Committee limits and impose taxes on properties coming under its jurisdiction.

Religion
Hindu 96.27%, Sikh 0.03%, Muslim 3.31%,

Ramnagar Specialities

Ramnagar is known for its Golgappas (Pani Puri), Chocolate (Barfi), Sund (panjeeri), Patisa and its exotic local food – Rajma-rice (served with chutney made from dried seeds of pomegranate) is one of the cuisines of Ramanagar. Another speciality of Ramnagar is Kalaadi or Kalari cheese, which is a variety of processed cheese. Kalaadi, specially made in the Ramnagar district of Jammu province is considered to be the best in quality all over the state.

Dogra cuisines include Ambal (sweet-salty vegetable made of pumpkin), Khatta Maas, Kulthein di Dal (a Dogra Pulse (legume)), Dal Patt, Maa da Madra, Rajma, Auriya and Kalari (authentic Dogra cheese). Pickles typical of Jammu are made of Kasrod, Girgle, Mango with Saunf, Zimikand, Tyaoo, Seyoo, and Potatoes. Auriya is a dish made with Potatoes. During weddings, it is typical to make Kayoor (another cuisine served with sweet curd), Sund (sweet dish made of dry-fruits) and Sewian (buur).

Schools and Institutions
Bhartiya Vidya Niketan Kirmoo, Rising Pillars Public High School, Bhartiya Vidya Mandhir High School, Keshav Vidya Kendar High School, Emmanuel Mission High School, National Public High School, Government Higher Secondary School, Government Girls High School and Government Middle School  are some famous Schools Of Ramnagar.

Government Degree College, Ramnagar  
The college is located at the Thaplal village at a distance of about 41 km from Udhampur. The college was established in the year 2005, having area of about 300 kanals, providing a quiet and serene view and ideal for study and contemplation. The institution is affiliated to University of Jammu and recognized by UGC under section 2(f) & 12(b) of UGC Act 1956.

Narsing Dev Institute of Nursing & Paramedical Sciences Ramnagar is the first Paramedical Institute in the Town and is registered under the Paramedical Council of Jammu and Kashmir.

Another Paramedical college in Ramnagar is Ramnagar College for Nursing And Medical Education.

Notable personalities
 Rumalo Ram
 Sars Bharti Cutie

See also
 Battle of Ramnagar

References

External links 
 The Official Website of Dudu ,Basantgarh &Ramnagar region, India

Cities and towns in Udhampur district